Samuel Hopkinson (1 October 1825 – 26 June 1887) was an Australian cricketer. He played two first-class cricket matches for Victoria between 1861 and 1863.

See also
 List of Victoria first-class cricketers

References

1825 births
1887 deaths
Australian cricketers
Victoria cricketers
People from Thorne, South Yorkshire
Cricketers from Doncaster